Zane Birdwell is a Grammy-winning American audio producer, sound designer, and composer, originally from Chattanooga, Tennessee and later based in New York City.

Career
Birdwell has worked as a sound designer and engineer for New World Stages, Ars Nova, and stageFARM. He currently works at the Naked Angels theater company.

At the 52nd Annual Grammy Awards (2010), Birdwell was awarded a Grammy Award for Best Spoken Word Album for his engineering work on the audiobook edition of Michael J. Fox's memoir Always Looking Up. Birdwell has also engineered audiobooks for Paul Shaffer, Patti Lupone, Taya Kyle, and Wally Lamb. 

Birdwell has written music for Disney, HarperCollins, Macmillan Education, Mango Languages, and Creative Teaching Press. He released the original album World Class People in 2010, and a compilation of previous works in film, television, and theater called Translations in 2012.

References

American audio engineers
Place of birth missing (living people)
Year of birth missing (living people)
Musicians from Memphis, Tennessee
Living people
American male composers
21st-century American composers
21st-century American male musicians